Bohumil Sýkora (born 1902, date of death unknown) was a Czech weightlifter. He competed in the men's middleweight event at the 1928 Summer Olympics.

References

1902 births
Year of death missing
Czech male weightlifters
Olympic weightlifters of Czechoslovakia
Weightlifters at the 1928 Summer Olympics
Place of birth missing